Taverniera is a genus of legume in the family Fabaceae.
It contains the following species:
 Taverniera sericophylla – Yemen
 Taverniera abyssinica – Ethiopia

Hedysareae
Taxonomy articles created by Polbot
Fabaceae genera